"Everybody's Talkin' (Echoes)" is a song written and recorded by American singer-songwriter Fred Neil in 1966 and released two years later. A version of the song performed by American singer-songwriter Harry Nilsson became a hit in 1969, reaching No. 6 on the Billboard Hot 100 chart and winning a Grammy Award after it was featured in the film Midnight Cowboy. The song, which describes the singer's desire to retreat from the harshness of the city to a more peaceful place and an easier life, is among the most famous works of both artists, and has been covered by many other notable performers.

Background
The song was first released on Neil's second album, the eponymous Fred Neil, released in late 1966. It was composed towards the end of the session, after Neil had become anxious to wrap the album so he could return to his home in Miami, Florida. Manager Herb Cohen promised that if Neil wrote and recorded a final track, he could go. "Everybody's Talkin, recorded in one take, was the result.

Toby Creswell writing in 1001 Songs notes that the song had parallels to Neil's later life—like the hero of Midnight Cowboy, he looked "for fame to match his talents, discover[ed] that success in his profession isn't all its cracked up to be" and wanted to retreat. Five years later, Neil permanently fulfilled the promise of the speaker in the song, rejecting fame to live the rest of his life in relative obscurity "where the sun keeps shining / thru' the pouring rain" in his home in Coconut Grove, Miami.

Harry Nilsson version

Harry Nilsson was searching for a successful song when Rick Jarrard played the track for him, and he decided to record it on November 13, 1967. It was eventually released on his 1968 album Aerial Ballet. When released as a single in July 1968, it managed to reach only No. 13 on the Billboard Bubbling Under the Hot 100 chart. After the song was featured as the theme song in the film Midnight Cowboy in 1969, the song was re-released as a single and became a hit, peaking at No. 6 on the Billboard Hot 100 chart and No. 2 on the Billboard Easy Listening chart.

When Derek Taylor recommended Nilsson for the Midnight Cowboy soundtrack to director John Schlesinger, Schlesinger selected "Everybody's Talkin, preferring the cover to the song Nilsson proposed, "I Guess the Lord Must Be in New York City".

The song was used as the theme song for the movie and became closely identified with it; Nilsson's cover is also known as "Everybody's Talkin' (Theme from Midnight Cowboy)". William J. Mann, in his biography of Schlesinger, noted that "one cannot imagine Midnight Cowboy now without 'Everybody's Talkin'".

Personnel
According to the AFM contract sheet, the following musicians played on the track, excluding Harry Nilsson’s vocals.

Al Casey - acoustic guitars
Mike Melvoin - piano
Larry Knechtel - bass guitar
Jim Gordon - drums
Alfred Lustgarten - violin
Jerome Reisler - violin
Wilbert Nuttycombe - violin
Leonard Atkins - violin
Darrel Terwilliger - violin
Arnold Belnick - violin

Theme and style
Described in The Rock Snob*s Dictionary as an "anti-urban plaint", "Everybody's Talkin depicts the introverted speaker's inability to connect with others. Not hearing or truly seeing them, the speaker declares an intention to leave for the ocean and the summer breeze. AllMusic's Denise Sullivan describes Neil's version as "positively spooky and Spartan" by comparison to Nilsson's better-known cover, whose arrangement she felt captured the "freedom, shrouded in regret and loss, implied in the lyric".

The line "Going where the weather suits my clothes" is paraphrased from "Going Down the Road Feeling Bad", a traditional American folk song.

Reception and legacy
Nilsson's single for the song sold over a million copies and charted on both Billboards Adult Contemporary and Pop Singles charts, reaching numbers 2 and 6 respectively in 1969. Nilsson's single also won a Grammy that year. The song became a global success and was followed by international appearances by Nilsson to perform it.

Nilsson denied that the song made him successful. Creswell, writing in 1001 Songs, claims that the hit "made Nilsson a superstar," exposing him to a much broader fan base and altering his reputation from solely that of a songwriter to a singer. After Nilsson's death, Billboard noted that Nilsson remained popularly remembered for his covers of "Everybody's Talkin and "Without You". Neil, too, is largely remembered for this song. But although Neil's second album was re-released in 1969 under the title Everybody's Talkin' to capitalize on the success of the song, Neil himself shunned the limelight, retiring from the industry after his final album in 1971 to live quietly in the Florida Keys with the millions of dollars he is estimated to have earned on royalties from the song. In keeping with the song's position in the works of both artists, it has been used to title several "greatest hits" compilation albums—a 1997 release by BMG, a 2001 release by Armoury and a 2006 release by RCA for Nilsson and a 2005 release for Neil by Raven Records entitled Echoes of My Mind: The Best of 1963–1971.

The song is highly regarded in the industry, having become a standard. Songwriter Jerry Leiber described it as "a very strange and beautiful song", among the "truly beautiful melodically and lyrically" songs by Fred Neil, who was described by Rolling Stone as "[r]eclusive, mysterious and extravagantly gifted". A 2006 article in The New York Times characterizes the song as "a landmark of the classic-rock era." The song's popularity has proven persistent; through 2005, according to figures from Broadcast Music Incorporated reported in The New York Times, the song had aired on radio and television 6.7 million times. In 2004, the song was listed by the American Film Institute as No. 20 in its "top 100 movie songs" for the first 100 years of film.

Other cover versions
Since Nilsson's version of the song achieved chart success, the song has been covered by many other artists—almost 100 as of 2006. The more notable versions include ones by Stevie Wonder, Willie Nelson, Neil Diamond, Liza Minnelli, Tony Bennett, Luna, Bill Withers, Madeleine Peyroux, Louis Armstrong, Leonard Nimoy, Julio Iglesias, Lena Horne, Harold Melvin and the Blue Notes, the Beautiful South and Crosby, Stills & Nash. Nilsson's version was sampled in 2002 by Paul Oakenfold on "Starry Eyed Surprise" and in 2004 by the Go! Team on "Everyone's a V.I.P. to Someone".

Charts and certifications

Weekly charts
Fred Neil version

Nilsson version

The Beautiful South version

Year-end charts
Nilsson version

Certifications

References

External links
 

1966 songs
1968 singles
1969 singles
1994 singles
Harry Nilsson songs
The Beautiful South songs
Grammy Hall of Fame Award recipients
Grammy Award for Best Male Pop Vocal Performance
American soft rock songs
Song recordings produced by Nick Venet
RPM Top Singles number-one singles
Bill Withers songs
RCA Victor singles
Songs written by Fred Neil